Filippo Bottino (9 December 1888 – 18 October 1969) was an Italian heavyweight weightlifter who won a gold medal at the 1920 Olympics. In 1922 he became the first Italian weightlifter to break a world record, in the press, and in 1924 he finished sixth at the Paris Olympics. He was made a Knight of the Italian Republic received the Medal of Honour for Sporting Merit.

References

1888 births
1969 deaths
Italian male weightlifters
Olympic weightlifters of Italy
Weightlifters at the 1920 Summer Olympics
Weightlifters at the 1924 Summer Olympics
Olympic gold medalists for Italy
Olympic medalists in weightlifting
Medalists at the 1920 Summer Olympics
20th-century Italian people